Nebraska Highway 45 is a highway in Nebraska. It has a southern terminus at Nebraska Highway 91 south of Newman Grove. It has a northern terminus in Tilden at an intersection with U.S. Highway 275.

Route description
Nebraska Highway 45 begins at Nebraska Highway 91 south of Newman Grove. It goes north through Newman Grove and then meets Nebraska Highway 32. At the border, Highway 45 turns north and separates from Highway 32. Highway 45 continues north, serving as the west border of Madison County and the east border of Boone County and Antelope County, ending in Tilden at U.S. Highway 275.

Major intersections

References

External links

Nebraska Roads: NE 41-60

045
Transportation in Platte County, Nebraska
Transportation in Madison County, Nebraska
Transportation in Boone County, Nebraska
Transportation in Antelope County, Nebraska